The 1996 D1 ADAC Super Tourenwagen Cup was the third season of the Super Tourenwagen Cup (STW).

Season summary
The 1996 STW season was dominated by works Audi driver Emanuele Pirro, who won the majority of the races during the year. Briton Steve Soper was the only man to challenge him for the title, but a slow start to his championship hampered his title chase, and Pirro won the title at the penultimate racing weekend at the AVUS track. This was also Laurent Aïello and Peugeot's first season in the German championship, and while the Frenchman won several races he was too inconsistent to finish any higher than third.

Teams and drivers

Race calendar and results

Championship results

Manufacturers' Trophy

References

Footnotes

External links 

Super Tourenwagen Cup
Super Tourenwagen Cup Season